Trout is the surname of:

People
Austin Trout (born 1985), American boxer, former WBA super welterweight champion
Bobbi Trout (1906–2003), American female pioneering aviator
Charles H. Trout (1935–2006), historian and American college president
Dink Trout (1898–1950), American actor and radio personality
Dizzy Trout (1915–1972), American Major League Baseball pitcher
G. Malcolm Trout (1896–1990), American food science professor, Michigan State University
Grace Wilbur Trout (1864–1955), American suffragist
Harry E. Trout (1876–1941), head college football coach for the West Virginia University Mountaineers in 1903
Harry L. Trout, American mayor of Lancaster, Pennsylvania (1915–1920)
J. D. Trout (born 1959), American philosopher and cognitive scientist
Jack Trout (1935–2017), American advertising and marketing theorist, a founder and pioneer of positioning theory
James M. Trout (1850–1910), United States Navy sailor and recipient of the Medal of Honor
Jennie Kidd Trout (1841–1921), first female licensed physician in Canada
Jessie Trout (1895–1990), Canadian missionary in Japan
Michael Trout (Australian politician) (born 1963), member of the Legislative Assembly of Queensland
Michael Carver Trout (1810–1873), U.S. Representative from Pennsylvania
Mike Trout (born 1991), American Major League Baseball player
Monroe Trout (born 1962), hedge fund manager
Nelson Wesley Trout (1921–1996), first African-American bishop in the Evangelical Lutheran Church in America
Robert Trout (1909–2000), American journalist
Ryan Trout (born 1978), American former soccer player
Steve Trout (born 1957), American retired Major League Baseball pitcher, son of Dizzy Trout
Walter Trout (born 1951), American blues musician

Fictional or mythological characters
the title character of the 1968 novel Eva Trout by Elizabeth Bowen
Ketil Trout (disambiguation), several figures in Norse folklore
Kilgore Trout, created by writer Kurt Vonnegut

English-language surnames